Paul Charles is a British novelist, music promoter and talent agent.

Paul Charles may also refer to:

Paul Charles (actor), see After Dark (magazine)
Paul Charles (politician) on List of ministers of the Belgian Congo

See also
RuPaul Andre Charles, American actor, drag queen, model, author, and singer-songwriter